Babylicious is a Pakistani romantic comedy film written, directed and produced by Essa Khan under the banner Coconut Entertainment Pakistan. It stars former couple Shehroz Sabzwari and Syra Yousuf, alongside Ankur Rathee and Adnan Jaffar.  Produced in part by activist and crypto currency entrepreneur Waqar Zaka, the film is shot extensively in Manama, Bahrain and Karachi, Pakistan. The movie is ex-couples' first time out on the big screen after their separation.

Babylicious is scheduled for theatrical release on 27 June 2023, coinciding with Eid al-Adha.

Premise 
A hopeless romantic takes on the world to break up his ex-girlfriend's wedding and win her back.

Cast 

 Shehroz Sabzwari
 Syra Yousuf
 Ankur Rathee
 Shehzeen Rahat
 Aadi Adeal Amjad
 Sabeena Syed
 Adnan Jaffar
 Laila Wasti
 Aamir Qureshi
 Mani Salman Saquib

Production 
The film was officially announced by Syra Yousuf and Shahroz Sabzwari on Valentine's Day post on Instagram in 2018, when they posted a BTS from their then untitled film. In an interview, Yousuf stated that she committed to the project after listening to the film's soundtrack.

Principal photography of the film commenced in 2018. The first schedule took place in Karachi, before moving to Bahrain. The film was slated for a possible Eid release in 2019,  but due to delays in filming and the COVID-19 pandemic, the film's release was postponed.

Marketing 
The title of the film was announced on 15 December 2022, along with a first look. The official teaser was released online by Coconut Entertainment on 22 December 2022 to rave reviews. The Express Tribune described Babylicious teaser "as sweet as one romantic film can be". 

The official film trailer was released on 11 January 2023.

Soundtrack 
The film album is primarily composed by Adrian David.  

The first single, titled "Mann Ranjhan", was released on 30 December 2022.  Pop culture website Something Haute hailed the song "a memorable addition to the list of melodious love songs from Pakistani films."

The second single, titled "Ghazab Kurriye", accompanied by its music video was released on 14 February 2023. The music video of the song made waves for its production design, costumes and choreography with more than one publication labeling it the wedding anthem of the year.

Release 
The film was initially scheduled to release on 10 February 2023. However it is now postponed to 27 June 2023, coinciding with the Eid festival.

References

External links 
 

2023 films
Pakistani romantic comedy films
Unreleased Pakistani films
Urdu-language Pakistani films
Upcoming films
2020s Urdu-language films